Triphenyltin hydroxide is an organotin compound with formula Sn(C6H5)3OH. Triphenyltin hydroxide is used as a fungicide for potatoes, sugar beets, and pecans. It was first registered for use as a pesticide in the United States in 1971.

Structure

While triphenyltin hydroxide is often depicted as a monomer, it crystallizes as a polymer with a bridging hydroxide groups. The Sn-O distances are 2.18 and 2.250 Å. Many organotin compounds engage in similar aggregation equilibria.

References

Triphenyltin compounds
Fungicides